Joris Voest (born 8 January 1995) is a Dutch footballer who plays for Harkemase Boys, as a defender.

References

1995 births
Living people
Dutch footballers
SC Heerenveen players
FC Emmen players
Harkemase Boys players
Eerste Divisie players
Derde Divisie players
Association football defenders
People from Terschelling
Footballers from Friesland